Robert Wilson Sears (November 30, 1884 – January 9, 1979) was an American épée and foil fencer and modern pentathlete. He won a bronze medal in the team foil event at the 1920 Summer Olympics.

A 1909 graduate of the United States Military Academy at West Point, New York, with George S. Patton, Jacob L. Devers and William Hood Simpson among his fellow graduates, he was captain of the Army team that twice won the IFA foil team title. In 1909 he shared individual honors with his teammate, Reginald Cocroft. At the 1920 Olympics, Sears won a bronze medal in foil team at the age of 36, participated in the épée team event, and finished eighth in modern pentathlon.

Sears spent most of his military career as an Ordnance officer but during World War II was commander of the 137th Infantry Regiment in the 35th Infantry Division in France. At the age of 60, he was the oldest combat soldier in the European Theater of Operations. He retired in 1946 with the rank of colonel.

He died in Atlanta on January 9, 1979.

References

External links

1884 births
1979 deaths
19th-century American people
20th-century American people
American male épée fencers
American male modern pentathletes
Olympic modern pentathletes of the United States
Fencers at the 1920 Summer Olympics
Modern pentathletes at the 1920 Summer Olympics
Olympic bronze medalists for the United States in fencing
Sportspeople from Portland, Oregon
Fencers from Portland, Oregon
United States Army personnel of World War II
Medalists at the 1920 Summer Olympics
United States Army colonels
United States Military Academy alumni
United States Army personnel of World War I
American male foil fencers